Realitos is an unincorporated community and census-designated place (CDP) in Duval County, Texas, United States. The population was 184 at the 2010 census.

History
The population of Realitos had reached a grand 400 people in 1890, four years after the first post office was established there. The population peaked when an estimated 800 were living there just two years later in 1892. The population decreased and numbers like 225 people in 1914 appeared. In the 1960s, Realitos still had a running school, but it consolidated with Benavides in the middle of the next decade. Many buildings remain in the small, unincorporated community today including a closed pool hall, store, and gas station.

Geography
Realitos is located in southern Duval County at  (27.445491, -98.528786).

Demographics
As of the census of 2000, there were 209 people, 77 households, and 58 families residing in the CDP. The population density was 770.9 people per square mile (298.9/km2). There were 90 housing units at an average density of 332.0/sq mi (128.7/km2). The racial makeup of the CDP was 84.21% White, 2.87% Native American, 8.13% from other races, and 4.78% from two or more races. Hispanic or Latino of any race were 92.82% of the population.

There were 77 households, out of which 29.9% had children under the age of 18 living with them, 49.4% were married couples living together, 20.8% had a female householder with no husband present, and 23.4% were non-families. 23.4% of all households were made up of individuals, and 11.7% had someone living alone who was 65 years of age or older. The average household size was 2.71 and the average family size was 3.20.

In the CDP, the population was spread out, with 26.3% under the age of 18, 10.0% from 18 to 24, 20.6% from 25 to 44, 24.9% from 45 to 64, and 18.2% who were 65 years of age or older. The median age was 41 years. For every 100 females, there were 99.0 males. For every 100 females age 18 and over, there were 108.1 males.

The median income for a household in the CDP was $18,625, and the median income for a family was $17,125. Males had a median income of $18,958 versus $18,750 for females. The per capita income for the CDP was $11,221. About 41.5% of families and 51.0% of the population were below the poverty line, including 82.5% of those under the age of eighteen and 75.0% of those 65 or over.

Realitos is the youngest city in America by median age, with the average citizen age being only just over seven years old.

Education
Realitos is served by the Benavides Independent School District.

References

Census-designated places in Duval County, Texas
Census-designated places in Texas
Unincorporated communities in Duval County, Texas
Unincorporated communities in Texas